The 1984 Pittsburgh Steelers season was the franchise's 52nd season as a professional sports franchise and as a member of the National Football League.

Most of the stars from the 1970s had departed, but the Steelers showed signs of their past glory by amassing a 9–7 record to capture the AFC Central Title again. The highlight of the season was an October 14 win over the 49ers in San Francisco. It was the only loss the 49ers suffered all season. Also serving up highlights that season was WR Louis Lipps who won the Offensive Rookie of the Year. In the playoffs the Steelers stunned the Broncos 24–17 in Denver to earn a trip to the AFC Championship. However, the Steelers season would end with a 45–28 thrashing at the hands of the Dolphins in Miami. This season was the last time the Steelers appeared in a playoff game until 1989, marking the end of the long lived and storied Steel Curtain.

Personnel

Staff

Roster
1984 would prove to be somewhat of a transition year for the Steelers, as it would mark the final season of several key members of their 1970s dynasty -- most notably Jack Lambert (who missed several games during the season due to a recurring turf toe injury), but also Larry Brown and Craig Colquitt -- as well as the retirement of Mel Blount in mid-March and the unexpected retirement of Terry Bradshaw in late July.

Additionally, Cliff Stoudt, the starting quarterback in 1983 while Bradshaw was injured, departed for the United States Football League, leaving the Steelers thin at the position after Bradshaw's retirement on the eve of training camp. The team would trade for former Miami Dolphins starter David Woodley, who had been supplanted on his former team by Oakland native and former Pitt quarterback Dan Marino. The Steelers infamously passed over Marino in the first round of the previous year's draft in favor of Gabriel Rivera, who by 1984 was already out of football; he suffered a spinal cord injury in a drunk driving crash that left him a quadriplegic for the rest of his life. Woodley would split time with Mark Malone under center.

In addition to Bradshaw, 1984 would also mark another unexpected departure: Franco Harris. Unlike Bradshaw, this would be due to a pay dispute. As Harris was closing in on Jim Brown's rushing record alongside Chicago's Walter Payton, Harris felt that he deserved a pay raise. The Rooney family, feeling that Harris was near the end of his career, felt otherwise, and it led to Harris's release during training camp. Harris would sign with the Seattle Seahawks and play eight games for that team before retiring 192 yards short of Brown's record, which would be surpassed by Payton that season.

On a positive note, 1984 would mark the first year of wide receiver Louis Lipps, who would set many team records during his career and would retire in second place on the Steelers all-time receiving list behind teammate John Stallworth; Lipps is currently fourth behind Hines Ward, Stallworth and Antonio Brown.

Offseason

Preseason

Schedule

Regular season

Schedule

Week 1: vs. Kansas City Chiefs

Mark Malone and David Woodley combined for 419 passing yards, three touchdowns, and two interceptions, while the Chiefs won despite putting up just 264 yards of total offense.

Week 2: at New York Jets

After coughing up four turnovers to the Chiefs, the Steelers picked off Pat Ryan three times and forced a fumble; they also bullied the Jets into eleven penalties for 115 yards.

Week 3: vs. Los Angeles Rams

The Steelers limited Eric Dickerson to 49 rushing yards and forced two Rams fumbles.

Week 4: at Cleveland Browns

Week 5: vs. Cincinnati Bengals

Week 6: vs. Miami Dolphins

Week 7 (Sunday, October 14, 1984): at San Francisco 49ers 

Point spread: 49ers by 8
 Over/Under: 42.0 (under)
 Time of Game: 

This game was not on many NBC stations, since game 5 of the World Series was being broadcast at the same time. However, that game would prove the last Sunday afternoon World Series game. This was the solitary game the eventual Super Bowl champion 49ers lost during the 1984 season.

Week 8: at Indianapolis Colts

This game was particularly frustrating to Steeler fans. One week previously, the Steelers beat the 49ers in San Francisco – becoming the solitary team to achieve this as the 49ers finished 15-1 on the way to winning the Super Bowl. Then coming back east to play one of the worst teams of the season, the Indianapolis Colts – who had only two wins at that point and were to win just four games for the season – they lost on a last minute improbable play after leading throughout the game.  The Colts’ third-string quarterback, Mike Pagel, came off the bench in the third quarter and was leading a final minute drive from their 20.  On the Colts 40 with 34 seconds left, Pagel avoided a near sack, scrambled right and threw down the middle of the field to WR Bernard Henry. The ball however went directly to the hands of Steeler CB Sam Washington who bobbled the ball. Between Washington and a few other Steeler defenders, WR Ray Butler burst through the gap, snatched the ball in the air and ran untouched 54 yards for the touchdown. The extra point sealed the game.

Week 9: vs. Atlanta Falcons

Week 10 vs. Houston Oilers

The Steelers limited Warren Moon and Oliver Luck to 224 yards; the Oilers fumbled four times.

Week 11: at Cincinnati Bengals

Week 12: at New Orleans Saints

The Saints won their first Monday Night game in seven tries, and also avenged a 1974 Monday Night loss to the Steelers at Tulane Stadium. It was Pittsburgh's first loss to New Orleans since 1969 in what was the Steelers’ final game in the NFL before moving to the AFC as part of the AFL-NFL merger.

Former Steelers linebacker Dennis Winston played for the Saints in this game. It was also a homecoming for Lipps, who played at nearby East St. John High School.

Week 13: vs. San Diego Chargers

Week 14: at Houston Oilers

The Steelers tied the game in the fourth yet fell in overtime, all despite intercepting Warren Moon three times.

Week 15: vs. Cleveland Browns

Week 16: at Los Angeles Raiders

Standings

Playoffs

AFC Divisional Playoff: at Denver Broncos

The Steelers sacked John Elway four times and picked him off twice.

AFC Championship Game: at Miami Dolphins

Dan Marino threw four touchdowns and over 400 yards, outdueling Mark Malone’s 312 yards and three scores; Miami picked off Malone three times.

Honors and awards 
UPI AFC Rookie of the Year – Louis Lipps wide receiver
AP Offensive Rookie of the Year – Louis Lipps
NFL Comeback Player of the Year – John Stallworth

References

External links
 1984 Pittsburgh Steelers season at Profootballreference.com 
 1984 Pittsburgh Steelers season statistics at jt-sw.com 

Pittsburgh Steelers seasons
Pittsburgh Steelers
AFC Central championship seasons
Pittsburgh Steelers season